Ronald Milton Mottl (born February 6, 1934) is an American lawyer and politician who served as a Democratic member of the state House of Representatives of Ohio from 1987 to 1997. Before that, he served four terms in the United States House of Representatives from 1975 to 1983.

Early life
Mottl was born in Cleveland, Ohio to Miroslav Václav Josef Mottl (1899-1945) and Anna Huml (1903-1990), a couple of Czech descent. His father, an immigrant from Počaply, died from chronic valvular heart disease when he was 11. His mother, born in Pittsburgh to parents from Kvaň and Mýto, remarried to Václav Schovánek (1907-1987) from Kladno. Mottl graduated from Parma Schaaf High School in 1952 and later was inducted into the school’s athletic hall of fame. He attended the University of Notre Dame for which he played baseball in 1955. He served in the United States Army Reserves in 1957.

Career
He is a lawyer, and served in the city council of Parma, Ohio from 1960 to 1966 and the Ohio state legislature from 1967 until 1975, before serving in the United States House of Representatives from 1975 to 1983. A conservative Democrat, Mottl was an ally of Ronald Reagan's legislative agenda.

He lost the Democratic primary to Ed Feighan in 1982, thereby losing his seat. He then returned to local politics, serving on the Parma school board from 1985 until 1986, and as president of the school board in 1986, until he was elected to the Ohio House of Representatives, where he served until 1997.

He now lives in North Royalton, Ohio, and was an unsuccessful candidate for Mayor of North Royalton in 1999.

Personal life
Mottl has four children. Ronald Jr. and Rhonda are from his first marriage and Ron Michael and Amanda Leigh are from his second marriage to Debbi.

See also
List of United States representatives from Ohio

References

1934 births
Living people
American people of Czech descent
Politicians from Cleveland
University of Notre Dame alumni
Notre Dame Law School alumni
Ohio lawyers
Democratic Party Ohio state senators
Democratic Party members of the Ohio House of Representatives
Notre Dame Fighting Irish baseball players
Lawyers from Cleveland
Military personnel from Cleveland
People from North Royalton, Ohio
Ohio city council members
School board members in Ohio
Democratic Party members of the United States House of Representatives from Ohio
United States Army soldiers
United States Army reservists